Stenoma sublimbata is a moth of the family Depressariidae. It is found in Panama, Colombia, Peru and Bolivia.

The wingspan is about 28 mm. The forewings are pale yellow ochreous, with a violet gloss, the dorsal half and terminal area tinged violet grey. There is some narrow violet-grey suffusion along the costa except on a patch about three-fourths, and leaving the costal edge pale yellowish throughout a dark brown irregular-edged blotch occupying the basal third of the dorsum. There are two small round dark brown spots transversely placed on the end of the cell, a larger reniform spot beyond the upper of these, and a still larger subtriangular spot extending from beyond the lower to near the dorsum. The hindwings are ochreous whitish with a narrow grey marginal streak around the posterior two-thirds of the costa and upper part of the termen, narrowed and obsolescent downwards.

References

Moths described in 1877
Stenoma